Bakdalbong is a mountain in South Korea. It sits between the city of Pocheon, Gyeonggi-do and Hwacheon county, Gangwon-do.

See also
List of mountains in Korea

Notes

References

Mountains of South Korea
Mountains of Gangwon Province, South Korea
Mountains of Gyeonggi Province